Samuel William Gray (1 January 1823 – 19 April 1889) was an Irish Australian pastoralist, farmer and member of the New South Wales Legislative Assembly for Kiama (1859–1864), Illawarra (1874–1880) and The Richmond (1882–1885).

Biography 
Samuel Gray was born in Armagh, Ireland on 1 January 1823 to James Mackey Gray and Sarah Anna Burton, the first of their five children and their only son. Around 1835, his family moved to New South Wales. James became a farmer and grazier there, also assisting many Ulster Protestants in migrating to Kiama. He was educated at the Normal Institution in Sydney. After going to sea in 1859 and to Bendigo during its gold rush, he returned to Kiama, becoming a farmer and grazier. He married Mary Bray on 14 March 1862 at Campbelltown. They had five daughters and two sons. In the early 1860s, he cleared and improved a large block of land on the Tweed River. Later, he moved to Sydney, where he had business interests, living there until his death in Woolahra on 19 April 1889. He was buried in the Gerringong Cemetery in Sydney.

On 16 June 1859, Samuel Gray was elected as the member of the New South Wales Legislative Assembly for Kiama, with 70.4 percent of the vote. He was re-elected unopposed in 1860. After leaving office in 1864, he was elected as the member for Illawarra in 1874 with 56.8 percent of the vote, and re-elected unopposed in 1877. He left office again in 1880 and was elected by the Richmond in 1882 with 60.4 percent of the vote, a position which he held until 1885 when he did not re-contest.

See also 
New South Wales Legislative Assembly

References 

 

1823 births
1889 deaths
Australian pastoralists
Members of the New South Wales Legislative Assembly
Irish emigrants to colonial Australia
People from Armagh (city)
19th-century Australian politicians
19th-century Australian businesspeople